Mountain Ranch (formerly, El Dorado and El Dorado Town) is a census-designated place (CDP) in Calaveras County, California, United States. The population was 1,628 at the 2010 census, up from 1,557 at the 2000 census. The town is registered as California Historical Landmark #282. The town center is quite small with fewer than 50 people living in it. The 5 mile square area surrounding the town accounts for the balance of the population.

History
The settlement was established during the California Gold Rush.  Mountain Ranch's post office was established in 1858. In 1868, it was moved to another town called El Dorado Camp 1.5 miles south, as there was already an El Dorado post office in California, El Dorado Camp became known as Mountain Ranch. Currently, there are 3 post office buildings in the town. The present one, a small post office which was built in 1956, and a post office built in 1923 which was once billed as the world's smallest post office. The original location of the town of Mountain Ranch also has a historical landmark. The bell on the historical marker was used in the local school from 1885 to 1953. Established as Cave City School District in 1855, this school joined with the Banner District in 1946 to become the El Dorado Union Elementary School District. In 1942 the last of the gold mines closed.  Further economic losses took place in the 1970s, when local saw mills shuttered, and also in 1983 when the Calaveras Cement Co. closed.  In 2015, the town was ravaged by the Butte Fire. More than 350 homes along the outskirts burned, but firefighters and local ranchers were able to save most of the downtown.

Geography

Demographics

At the 2010 census Mountain Ranch had a population of 1,628. The racial makeup of Mountain Ranch was 1,472 (90.4%) White, 15 (0.9%) African American, 33 (2.0%) Native American, 18 (1.1%) Asian, 2 (0.1%) Pacific Islander, 15 (0.9%) from other races, and 73 (4.5%) from two or more races. Hispanic or Latino of any race were 123 people (7.6%).

The whole population lived in households, no one lived in non-institutionalized group quarters and no one was institutionalized.

There were 748 households, 113 (15.1%) had children under the age of 18 living in them, 410 (54.8%) were opposite-sex married couples living together, 53 (7.1%) had a female householder with no husband present, 23 (3.1%) had a male householder with no wife present.  There were 50 (6.7%) unmarried opposite-sex partnerships, and 5 (0.7%) same-sex married couples or partnerships. 211 households (28.2%) were one person and 89 (11.9%) had someone living alone who was 65 or older. The average household size was 2.18.  There were 486 families (65.0% of households); the average family size was 2.60.

The age distribution was 213 people (13.1%) under the age of 18, 86 people (5.3%) aged 18 to 24, 201 people (12.3%) aged 25 to 44, 712 people (43.7%) aged 45 to 64, and 416 people (25.6%) who were 65 or older.  The median age was 55.3 years. For every 100 females, there were 105.8 males.  For every 100 females age 18 and over, there were 106.3 males.

There were 960 housing units at an average density of 23.3 per square mile (9.0/km),of which 748 were occupied, 620 (82.9%) by the owners and 128 (17.1%) by renters.  The homeowner vacancy rate was 2.8%; the rental vacancy rate was 9.8%.  1,352 people (83.0% of the population) lived in owner-occupied housing units and 276 people (17.0%) lived in rental housing units.

Politics

Notable natives
Jake Shields

References

External links

Census-designated places in Calaveras County, California
California Historical Landmarks
Census-designated places in California